Max Andrew Bird (born 18 September 2000) is an English footballer who can play either as a defensive midfielder or central midfielder for  club Derby County. He made his first-team debut in September 2017, aged 16.

Career
Having progressed through the Derby County Academy, Bird made his debut for the first team against Barnsley in the EFL Cup on 12 September 2017. Aged 16 at the time, he became Derby's eighth-youngest player. Shortly afterwards, he signed a new contract running until 2020.

Bird's first league appearance for Derby County came in the closing seconds of a 2–1 win over Swansea City on 1 December 2018, replacing Mason Mount. He made his first start on 2 March 2019 in a 4–0 away defeat to Aston Villa, playing the full 90 minutes of the game.

On 17 September 2020, Bird signed a new deal with Derby to take him through to the end of the 2023–24 season. He scored his first goal for Derby in a 2-1 win against Stoke City on 18 September 2021.

Career statistics

References

External links

Living people
2000 births
Sportspeople from Burton upon Trent
English footballers
Association football midfielders
Derby County F.C. players
English Football League players